The Glenwood Springs Hatchery is a Colorado Parks and Wildlife cold water fish production facility located on Mitchell Creek near the Colorado River in Garfield County, which is 2 miles north of West Glenwood Springs.

History
Glenwood Springs Hatchery was inaugurated in 1906. This hatchery was one operated by the state before 1914. The building was originally large and barn-like framed. An electronic egg-picking machine used to separate live and dead eggs were developed by Neil Van Gaalen, superintendent of Glenwood Springs hatchery, in the 1960s. This technology is utilized at all state-operated hatcheries.

Fish Species
Hatchery staff works to support the raising of rainbow trout, kokanee salmon, and arctic grayling. Annually they stock around 3 million sub-catchable fish for the waters of northwest Colorado. The facility also has broodstocks of rainbow and cutthroat trout. Eggs that are produced are shipped to other state-operated fish hatcheries to be hatched, raised, and stocked at various sizes.

References 

Fish hatcheries in the United States
Buildings and structures in Garfield County, Colorado
Tourist attractions in Colorado